The Barley Mow is a historic public house, just south of the River Thames near the bridge at Clifton Hampden, Oxfordshire, England.

Overview 
The pub has been called "the best known of all Thames pubs".
The timber-framed building dates back to 1352 and is of traditional construction 
with a thatched roof.

The Barley Mow was photographed by Henry Taunt in 1877. The building was Grade II listed in 1952.

According to the Thames Pilot, The Barley Mow was described in Parker's notes (1911):

The Barley Mow is currently run by the Spirit Pub Company, a large UK chain of pubs, restaurants and inns which operates the Barley Mow under their "Chef & Brewer" brand.

In literature 
The Barley Mow was notably featured in chapter 18 of Jerome K. Jerome's 1889 novel Three Men in a Boat:

Peter Lovesey's Swing, Swing Together mentions the Barley Mow.

Gallery

See also 
 The Bull at Sonning, also mentioned in Three Men in a Boat

Bibliography 

 Jerome, Jerome K. Three Men in a Boat (To Say Nothing of the Dog). J. W. Arrowsmith, 1889.
 Richardson, Sir Albert Edward, and Hector Othon Corfiato. The Art of Architecture. Greenwood Press, 1972.
 Winn, Christopher. I Never Knew That About the River Thames. Ebury Press, 2010.

References

External links 

 

1352 establishments in England
Grade II listed pubs in Oxfordshire
Buildings and structures on the River Thames
Timber framed buildings in England
Thatched buildings in England